The 72nd Pennsylvania House of Representatives District is located in west central Pennsylvania and has been represented by Frank Burns since 2009.

District profile
The 72nd District is located in Cambria County and includes the following areas:

Blacklick Township
Brownstown
 Cambria Township
Conemaugh Township
 Croyle Township
Daisytown
Dale
 East Conemaugh
 East Taylor Township
 Ebensburg
Ehrenfeld
Franklin
 Jackson Township
Johnstown
Lorain
 Lower Yoder Township
 Middle Taylor Township
Nanty Glo
Southmont
 Summerhill
 Upper Yoder Township
Vintondale
West Taylor Township
 Westmont

Representatives

References

Government of Cambria County, Pennsylvania
72